The 2022–23 Los Angeles Clippers season is the 53rd season of the franchise in the National Basketball Association (NBA), their 45th season in Southern California and their 39th season in Los Angeles.

Draft

Roster

Roster Notes
Guard Eric Gordon makes his second tour of duty with team having played for them from 2008-2011.
Guard Russell Westbrook is the 31st former Lakers player to play for the Clippers.

Standings

Division

Conference

Game log

Preseason

|- style="background:#ccffcc;"
| 1
| September 30
| Maccabi Ra'anana
| 
| Luke Kennard (16)
| Moses Brown (13)
| Jason Preston (10)
| Climate Pledge Arena9,333
| 1–0
|-style="background:#cfc"
| 2
| October 3
| Portland
| 
| Amir Coffey (15)
| Moussa Diabaté (11)
| Xavier Moon (4)
| Climate Pledge Arena18,440
| 2–0
|-style="background:#fcc"
| 3
| October 9
| Minnesota
| 
| John Wall (20)
| Ivica Zubac (8)
| Paul George (4)
| Crypto.com Arena16,466
| 2–1
|-style="background:#fcc"
| 4
| October 12
| Denver
| 
| Norman Powell (34)
| Paul George (6)
| George, Wall (4)
| Toyota Arena (Ontario)8,812
| 2–2

Regular season

|-style="background:#cfc"
| 1
| October 20
| at L.A. Lakers
| 
| George, Wall (15)
| Ivica Zubac (17)
| George, Jackson (4)
| Crypto.com Arena (LAL)18,997
| 1–0
|-style="background:#cfc"
| 2
| October 22
| at Sacramento
| 
| Paul George (40)
| Ivica Zubac (8)
| Paul George (6)
| Golden 1 Center16,296
| 2–0
|-style="background:#fcc"
| 3
| October 23
| Phoenix
| 
| Marcus Morris Sr. (22)
| Ivica Zubac (8)
| George, Wall (4)
| Crypto.com Arena19,068
| 2–1
|-style="background:#fcc;"
| 4
| October 25
| at Oklahoma City
| 
| Luke Kennard (15)
| Ivica Zubac (14)
| Reggie Jackson (6)
| Paycom Center13,105
| 2–2
|-style="background:#fcc"
| 5
| October 27
| at Oklahoma City 
| 
| Norman Powell (21)
| Ivica Zubac (18)
| Reggie Jackson (4)
| Paycom Center14,510
| 2–3
|-style="background:#fcc"
| 6
| October 30
| New Orleans
| 
| Norman Powell (18) 
| Marcus Morris Sr. (8)
| John Wall (6)
| Crypto.com Arena18,142
| 2–4
|-style="background:#cfc"
| 7
| October 31
| Houston
| 
| Paul George (35)
| Ivica Zubac (12)
| Paul George (8)
| Crypto.com Arena14,887
| 3–4

|-style="background:#cfc;"
| 8
| November 2
| at Houston
| 
| Paul George (28)
| Marcus Morris Sr. (10)
| Paul George (5)
| Toyota Center15,860
| 4–4
|-style="background:#cfc;"
| 9
| November 4
| at San Antonio
| 
| Paul George (35)
| Ivica Zubac (15)
| John Wall (6)
| AT&T Center12,603
| 5–4
|-style="background:#fcc;"
| 10
| November 6
| Utah
| 
| Paul George (34)
| Ivica Zubac (9)
| John Wall (6)
| Crypto.com Arena16,111
| 5–5
|-style="background:#cfc"
| 11
| November 7
| Cleveland
| 
| Paul George (26)
| Ivica Zubac (9)
| Reggie Jackson (7)
| Crypto.com Arena16,516
| 6–5
|-style="background:#cfc"
| 12
| November 9
| L.A. Lakers
| 
| Paul George (29)
| Morris Sr., Zubac (8)
| John Wall (6)
| Crypto.com Arena (LAC)19,068
| 7–5
|- style="background:#fcc;"
| 13
| November 12
| Brooklyn
| 
| Paul George (17)
| Ivica Zubac (15)
| Jackson, Wall (6)
| Crypto.com Arena17,777
| 7–6
|-style="background:#cfc"
| 14
| November 14
| at Houston 
| 
| Paul George (22)
| Paul George (8)
| Reggie Jackson (6)
| Toyota Center16,098
| 8–6
|-style="background:#fcc"
| 15
| November 15
| at Dallas
| 
| Paul George (23)
| George, Zubac (7)
| Paul George (6)
| American Airlines Center19,810
| 8–7
|-style="background:#cfc"
| 16
| November 17
| Detroit
| 
| Reggie Jackson (23)
| Ivica Zubac (18)
| Leonard, Wall (4)
| Crypto.com Arena17,822
| 9–7
|-style="background:#cfc"
| 17
| November 19
| San Antonio 
| 
| Norman Powell (26)
| Ivica Zubac (11)
| John Wall (15)
| Crypto.com Arena18,581
| 10–7
|-style="background:#cfc;"
| 18
| November 21
| Utah
| 
| Norman Powell (30)
| Ivica Zubac (14)
| John Wall (8)
| Crypto.com Arena19,068
| 11–7
|-style="background:#fcc"
| 19
| November 23
| at Golden State
| 
| Marcus Morris Sr. (19)
| Norman Powell (7)
| Amir Coffey (7)
| Chase Center18,064
| 11–8
|-style="background:#fcc;"
| 20
| November 25
| Denver
| 
| John Wall (23)
| Ivica Zubac (9)
| Reggie Jackson (8)
| Crypto.com Arena16,559
| 11–9
|-style="background:#cfc"
| 21
| November 27
| Indiana
| 
| Ivica Zubac (31)
| Ivica Zubac (29)
| John Wall (8)
| Crypto.com Arena16,805
| 12–9
|-style="background:#cfc;"
| 22
| November 29
| at Portland
| 
| Norman Powell (32)
| Ivica Zubac (13)
| Reggie Jackson (12)
| Moda Center17,251
| 13–9
|-style="background:#fcc;"
| 23
| November 30
| at Utah
| 
| John Wall (26)
| Moussa Diabaté (8)
| John Wall (5)
| Vivint Arena18,206
| 13–10

|-style="background:#fcc;"
| 24
| December 3
| Sacramento
| 
| Brandon Boston Jr. (18)
| Ivica Zubac (15)
| Robert Covington (4)
| Crypto.com Arena16,587
| 13–11
|-style="background:#cfc;"
| 25
| December 5
| at Charlotte
| 
| Paul George (19)
| Ivica Zubac (8)
| John Wall (12)
| Spectrum Center13,945
| 14–11
|-style=background:#fcc;"
| 26
| December 7
| at Orlando
| 
| Terance Mann (19)
| Ivica Zubac (13)
| Batum, George (5)
| Amway Center14,429
| 14–12
|-style=background:#fcc;"
| 27
| December 8
| at Miami
| 
| Paul George (29)
| George, Zubac (8)
| John Wall (8)
| FTX Arena19,600
| 14–13
|-style=background:#cfc;"
| 28
| December 10
| at Washington
| 
| Paul George (36)
| George, Leonard (8)
| George, Leonard (6)
| Capital One Arena18,404
| 15–13
|-style=background:#cfc;"
| 29
| December 12
| Boston
| 
| Paul George (26)
| Kawhi Leonard (9)
| Kawhi Leonard (6)
| Crypto.com Arena19,068
| 16–13
|-style=background:#cfc;"
| 30
| December 14
| Minnesota
| 
| Kawhi Leonard (19)
| Paul George (11)
| Paul George (11)
| Crypto.com Arena14,068
| 17–13
|-style=background:#fcc;"
| 31
| December 15
| Phoenix
| 
| Terance Mann (22)
| Moses Brown (12)
| John Wall (5)
| Crypto.com Arena15,778
| 17–14
|-style=background:#cfc;"
| 32
| December 17
| Washington
| 
| Kawhi Leonard (31)
| Marcus Morris Sr. (12)
|  Mann, Wall (6)
| Crypto.com Arena15,018
| 18–14
|-style=background:#cfc;"
| 33
| December 21
| Charlotte
| 
| Paul George (22)
| George, Zubac (8)
| Paul George (8)
| Crypto.com Arena19,068
| 19–14
|-style=background:#fcc;"
| 34
| December 23
| at Philadelphia
| 
| Kawhi Leonard (28)
| Ivica Zubac (12)
| Kawhi Leonard (5)
| Wells Fargo Center19,996
| 19–15
|-style=background:#cfc;"
| 35
| December 26
| at Detroit
| 
| Paul George (32)
| Ivica Zubac (15)
| Paul George (11)
| Little Caesars Arena20,190
| 20–15
|-style=background:#cfc;"
| 36
| December 27
| at Toronto
| 
| George, Zubac (23)
| Ivica Zubac (16)
| Kawhi Leonard (8)
| Scotiabank Arena19,800
| 21–15
|-style=background:#fcc;"
| 37
| December 29
| at Boston
| 
| Kawhi Leonard (26)
| Ivica Zubac (11)
| Paul George (6)
| TD Garden19,156
| 21–16
|-style=background:#fcc;"
| 38
| December 31
| at Indiana
| 
| Paul George (45)
| Paul George (9)
| Kawhi Leonard (7)
| Gainbridge Fieldhouse16,731
| 21–17

|-style=background:#fcc;"
| 39
| January 2
| Miami
| 
| Paul George (25)
| Morris Sr., Zubac (7)
| Paul George (7)
| Crypto.com Arena19,068
| 21–18
|-style=background:#fcc;"
| 40
| January 5
| at Denver
| 
| Norman Powell (13)
| Moses Brown (10)
| Brandon Boston Jr. (4)
| Ball Arena19,087
| 21–19
|-style=background:#fcc;"
| 41
| January 6
| at Minnesota
| 
| Norman Powell (21)
| Moses Brown (11)
| John Wall (8)
| Target Center17,136
| 21–20
|-style=background:#fcc;"
| 42
| January 8
| Atlanta
| 
| Kawhi Leonard (29)
| Ivica Zubac (18)
| John Wall (5)
| Crypto.com Arena19,068
| 21–21
|-style=background:#cfc;"
| 43
| January 10
| Dallas
| 
| Kawhi Leonard (33)
| Kawhi Leonard (9)
| Leonard, Wall (4)
| Crypto.com Arena19,068
| 22–21
|-style=background:#fcc;"
| 44
| January 13
| Denver
| 
| Kawhi Leonard (24)
| Kawhi Leonard (8)
| Leonard, Mann, Wall (4)
| Crypto.com Arena16,005
| 22–22
|-style=background:#cfc;"
| 45
| January 15
| Houston
| 
| Terance Mann (31)
| Brown, Leonard, Mann (6)
| Reggie Jackson (5)
| Crypto.com Arena17,238
| 23–22
|-style=background:#fcc;"
| 46
| January 17
| Philadelphia 
| 
| Kawhi Leonard (27)
| Ivica Zubac (9)
| George, Jackson, Mann (4)
| Crypto.com Arena15,155
| 23–23
|-style=background:#fcc;"
| 47
| January 18
| at Utah
| 
| Norman Powell (30)
| Ivica Zubac (12)
| Terance Mann (5)
| Vivint Arena18,206
| 23–24
|-style=background:#cfc;"
| 48
| January 20
| at San Antonio
| 
| Kawhi Leonard (36)
| Ivica Zubac (16)
| Paul George (12)
| AT&T Center15,190
| 24–24
|-style=background:#cfc;"
| 49
| January 22
| at Dallas
| 
| Kawhi Leonard (30)
| Leonard, Zubac (9)
| Robert Covington (5)
| American Airlines Center20,026
| 25–24
|-style=background:#cfc;"
| 50
| January 24
| at L.A. Lakers
| 
| Paul George (27)
| George, Leonard (9)
| Nicolas Batum (6)
| Crypto.com Arena19,068
| 26–24
|-style=background:#cfc;"
| 51
| January 26
| San Antonio
| 
| Paul George (35)
| Robert Covington (7)
| George, Leonard (7)
| Crypto.com Arena19,068
| 27–24
|-style=background:#cfc;"
| 52
| January 28
| at Atlanta
| 
| Kawhi Leonard (32)
| Kawhi Leonard (8)
| Paul George (6)
| State Farm Arena18,448
| 28–24
|-style=background:#fcc;"
| 53
| January 29
| at Cleveland
| 
| Brandon Boston Jr. (24)
| Moses Brown (16)
| Jason Preston (8)
| Rocket Mortgage Fieldhouse19,432
| 28–25
|-style=background:#cfc;"
| 54
| January 31
| at Chicago
| 
| Kawhi Leonard (33)
| Ivica Zubac (12)
| Paul George (7)
| United Center20,068
| 29–25

|-style=background:#fcc;"
| 55
| February 2
| at Milwaukee
| 
| Norman Powell (26)
| Ivica Zubac (13)
| Kawhi Leonard (5)
| Fiserv Forum17,341
| 29–26
|-style=background:#cfc;"
| 56
| February 4
| at New York
| 
| Kawhi Leonard (35)
| Ivica Zubac (13)
| Paul George (5)
| Madison Square Garden19,812
| 30–26
|-style=background:#cfc;"
| 57
| February 6
| at Brooklyn
| 
| Paul George (29)
| Ivica Zubac (12)
| Kawhi Leonard (6)
| Barclays Center16,981
| 31–26
|-style=background:#fcc;"
| 58
| February 8
| Dallas
| 
| Norman Powell (24)
| Ivica Zubac (10)
| four players (4)
| Crypto.com Arena18,377
| 31–27
|-style=background:#fcc;"
| 59
| February 10
| Milwaukee
| 
| Brandon Boston Jr. (20)
| Paul George (11)
| Paul George (6)
| Crypto.com Arena16,614
| 31–28
|-style=background:#cfc;"
| 60
| February 14
| Golden State
| 
| Kawhi Leonard (33)
| Kawhi Leonard (7)
| Paul George (8)
| Crypto.com Arena16,741
| 32–28
|-style=background:#cfc;"
| 61
| February 16
| at Phoenix
| 
| George, Mann (26)
| Ivica Zubac (12) 
| Eric Gordon (7)
| Footprint Center17,071
| 33–28
|-style="background:#fcc;"
| 62
| February 24
| Sacramento
| 
| Kawhi Leonard (44)
| George, Plumlee (10)
| Russell Westbrook (14)
| Crypto.com Arena19,068
| 33–29
|-style="background:#fcc;"
| 63
| February 26
| @ Denver
| 
| Kawhi Leonard (33)
| Mason Plumlee (10)
| George, Westbrook (4)
| Ball Arena19,689
| 33–30
|-style="background:#fcc;"
| 64
| February 28
| Minnesota
| 
| Paul George (25)
| Plumlee, Zubac (9)
| Russell Westbrook (10)
| Crypto.com Arena17,022
| 33–31

|-style="background:#fcc;"
| 65
| March 2
| at Golden State
| 
| Kawhi Leonard (21)
| Mason Plumlee (20)
| Russell Westbrook (6)
| Chase Center18,064
| 33–32
|-style="background:#fcc;"
| 66
| March 3
| at Sacramento
| 
| Paul George (28)
| Mason Plumlee (8)
| Russell Westbrook (10)
| Golden 1 Center18,111
| 33–33
|-style="background:#cfc;"
| 67
| March 5
| Memphis
| 
| Paul George (42)
| Paul George (11)
| Russell Westbrook (6)
| Crypto.com Arena19,068
| 34–33
|-style=background:#cfc;"
| 68
| March 8
| Toronto
| 
| Kawhi Leonard (24)
| Kawhi Leonard (12)
| Russell Westbrook (7)
| Crypto.com Arena19,068
| 35–33
|-style=background:#cfc;"
| 69
| March 11
| New York
| 
| Kawhi Leonard (38)
| Paul George (8)
| Paul George (8)
| Crypto.com Arena19,068
| 36–33
|-style=background:#cfc;"
| 70
| March 15
| Golden State
| 
| Kawhi Leonard (30)
| Ivica Zubac (16)
| George, Westbrook (7)
| Crypto.com Arena19,068
| 37–33
|-style=background:#fcc;"
| 71
| March 18
| Orlando
| 
| Paul George (30)
| Ivica Zubac (16)
| Russell Westbrook (9)
| Crypto.com Arena17,533
| 37–34
|-style=background:#cfc;"
| 72
| March 19
| at Portland
| 
| Paul George (29)
| Russell Westbrook (12)
| Russell Westbrook (10)
| Moda Center18,714
| 38–34
|-style=background:;"
| 73
| March 21
| Oklahoma City
| 
|
|
|
| Crypto.com Arena19,068
| 0-0
|-style=background:;"
| 74
| March 23
| Oklahoma City
| 
|
|
|
| Crypto.com Arena19,068
| 0-0
|-style=background:;"
|  75
| March 25
| New Orleans
| 
|
|
|
| Crypto.com Arena19,068
| 0-0
|-style=background:;"
| 76
| March 27
| Chicago
| 
|
|
|
| Crypto.com Arena19,068
| 0-0
|-style=background:;"
| 77
| March 29
| at Memphis
| 
|
|
|
| Fedex Forum
| 0-0
|-style=background:;"
| 78
| March 31
| at Memphis
| 
|
|
|
| Fedex Forum
| 0-0

|-style=background:;"
| 79
| April 1
| at New Orleans
| 
|
|
|
| Smoothie King Center
| 0-0
|-style=background:;"
| 80
|  April 5
| Los Angeles
| 
|
|
|
| Crypto.com Arena
| 0-0
|-style=background:;"
| 81
| April 8
| Portland
| 
|
|
|
| Crypto.com Arena19,068
| 0-0
|-style=background:;"
| 82
| April 9
| at Phoenix
| 
|
|
|
| Footprint Center
| 0-0

Transactions

Trades

Free agents

Re-signed

Additions

Subtractions

References

Los Angeles Clippers seasons
Los Angeles Clippers
Los Angeles Clippers
Los Angeles Clippers
Clippers
Clippers